Rebekah Bradford (born April 30, 1983 in Apple Valley, Minnesota) is an American speed skater who has competed since 2002. She was named to the U.S. team for the 2010 Winter Olympics.

Graduated Apple Valley High School in 2001.

References
 NBCOlympics.com profile
 TeamUSA.org profile
 Pictures of Rebekah
 Rebekah at speedskatingnews.info
 How Rebekah Bradford Finished Her Bachelor's Degree Online

1983 births
American female speed skaters
Living people
Olympic speed skaters of the United States
Speed skaters at the 2010 Winter Olympics
People from Apple Valley, Minnesota
Apple Valley High School (Minnesota) alumni
21st-century American women